Nonacosylic acid, or nonacosanoic acid, is a 29-carbon long-chain saturated fatty acid with the chemical formula CH3(CH2)27COOH.

See also
List of saturated fatty acids
List of carboxylic acids

References

Fatty acids
Alkanoic acids